Luna Papa (Russian: Лунный папа) is a 1999 movie by Bakhtyar Khudojnazarov with collaboration from Russia, Tajikistan, Germany, Austria and France

Plot summary
17-year-old Mamlakat lives with her father Safar and her disabled brother Nasreddin, in a village in Tajikistan. She is working in a small restaurant and dreams of becoming an actress. When a wandering theatre company enters the city, she misses the theatrical performance and wanders for a while. She chances upon an aircraft pilot, Yassir, who pretends to be an actor and friend of a famous American actor. He promises to help her become an actress, but instead seduces her while she is in a dream-like fantasy. He leaves the village immediately afterwards.

When she later discovers that she is pregnant, she has no idea how this happened and who the father is.  Determined to preserve hers and their honour, her eccentric family sets out on a comic journey in order to find the father of Mamlakat's unborn child and to force him to marry her. During this journey - in an old car loaded with rabbits - they travel through Uzbekistan, Tajikistan, and Kyrgyzstan.  The family meets various bandits and the charming impostor Alik, who poses as the seducer in the dark, and falls in love with Mamlakat.

Cast
Chulpan Khamatova as Mamlakat
Moritz Bleibtreu as Nasreddin
Ato Mukhamedzhanov as Safar
Merab Ninidze as Alik
Polina Rajkina as Khabibula (voice only)
Nikolay Fomenko as Yassir
Dinmukhamet Akhimov as the gynaecologist
Sherali Abdulkajsov as Akbar

Filming location 
The film was shot in Kairakum, in north-western Tajikistan.

Awards
The film received the main prize "Golden Rose" at Kinotavr in 2000.

At the 2000 Russian Guild of Film Critics Awards the picture was awarded the prizes for Best Film and Best Director (Bakhtyar Khudojnazarov).

See also
Waiting for the Sea

References

External links

1999 films
1990s Russian-language films
Russian comedy-drama films
1999 comedy-drama films
Films about abortion
Films directed by Bakhtyar Khudojnazarov
Russian pregnancy films